Kharkhada Ramlothan is village and gram panchayat located in Atru Tehsil of Baran district, Rajasthan, India. It is a medium-sized village with a total of 209 families residing there. It comes under Atru Tehsil, which is about 18 kilometers away from Kharkhada Ramlothan.

Sex ratio 
In Kharkhada Ramlothan, children between the ages of 0-6 make up 11.09% of the total population, with a count of 118. The village's Average Sex Ratio stands at 945, which is higher than the state average of Rajasthan, which is 928. However, the Child Sex Ratio for Kharkhada Ramlothan is 735, lower than the Rajasthan average of 888.

Literacy 
Kharkhada Ramlothan boasts of a higher literacy rate compared to the state average of Rajasthan. As per the 2011 census, the literacy rate of the village was 70.30%, with male literacy at 85.80% and female literacy at 54.39%.

Population 
According to the Population Census 2011, the village has a population of 1,064, comprising 547 males and 517 females.

References

Gram Panchayats and Villages in Atru Tehsil